Netherton may refer to:

 Netherton, Cumbria
 Netherton, Kirklees
 Netherton, Merseyside
 Netherton, North Lanarkshire
 Netherton, Peterborough
 Netherton, Wakefield
 Netherton, Dudley, West Midlands